The 2023 St. Francis Red Flash men's volleyball team represents Saint Francis University in the 2023 NCAA Division I & II men's volleyball season. The Red Flash, led by 25th year head coach Mike Rumbaugh, play their home games at William H. Pitt Center. The Red Flash compete as a member of the newly created Northeast Conference men's volleyball conference. The Red Flash were picked to finish first in the NEC pre-season poll.

Season highlights
Will be filled in as the season progresses.

Roster

Schedule
TV/Internet Streaming information:
All home games will be streamed on NEC Front Row. Most road games will be streamed by the schools streaming service.

 *-Indicates conference match.
 Times listed are Eastern Time Zone.

Announcers for televised games
Stanford: Tim Swartz & Troy Clardy
Stanford: Tim Swartz & Jordan Watkins
Hawai'i: Kanoa Leahey, Chris McLachlin, & Ryan Tsuji
Hawai'i: 
NJIT: 
Alderson Broaddus: 
Fairleigh Dickinson: 
Penn State: 
St. Francis Brooklyn: 
LIU: 
Sacred Heart: 
Merrimack: 
Fairleigh Dickinson: 
Queens: 
Penn State: 
D'Youville: 
Daemen: 
Sacred Heart: 
Merrimack: 
St. Francis Brooklyn: 
LIU: 
D'Youville: 
Daemen:

References

2023 in sports in Pennsylvania
St. Francis
St. Francis